Abercanaid railway station served the village of Abercanaid, near Merthyr Tydfil in Wales. Opened by the Quakers Yard & Merthyr Railway, a joint Great Western Railway / Rhymney Railway Joint  operation, it became part of the Great Western Railway during the Grouping of 1923. Passing on to the Western Region of British Railways on nationalisation in 1948, it was closed by them three years later.

The site today

The site is now on the route of the Taff Trail. Abercanaid is served by the Valley Lines station at Pentre-bach, across the river.

References 

 Abercanaid station on navigable O. S. map
Picture of the station 

Disused railway stations in Merthyr Tydfil County Borough
Railway stations in Great Britain opened in 1886
Railway stations in Great Britain closed in 1951
Former Great Western Railway stations